Ellaville, Florida is a ghost town in Florida located in the Suwannee River State Park in Suwannee County, Florida, United States. Ellaville was located at the merging place of the Suwannee River and Withlacoochee River.

History 
Ellaville was founded in 1861 by George Franklin Drew a successful businessman and future governor of Florida. Franklin decided to build a mansion on the western banks of Suwannee River. The town was named Ellaville for honoring one of his slaves named Ella. He and Louis Bucki then built a mill that employed over 500 people and was one of the largest in Florida at the time. Soon the Florida Railroad built a line to the town that had direct access to the mill. Soon after that the town was booming. The town was in its heyday in the early 1870s and had a train station, two schools, two churches, a steamboat dock, masonic lodge, commissary and a sawmill. It was also involved in turpentine, railroad car building and logging. The town even had 1,000 residents in its peak. Later on in 1876, Franklin the town's founder went on to be governor. The town then soon started to decline near the turn of the century starting when its mill burned down in 1898 but was rebuilt quickly. Though there was no longer a significant number of pine still left. Both of the rivers soon had flooded and with the onset of the Great Depression showed there was no future for the town and the post office closed in 1942. The Drew Mansion was then abandoned and vandalized for many years until it was burnt to the ground in the 1970s. In 1986, the Hillman Bridge built in 1925 by the Federal Aid Project and designed by the RHH Blackwell Company of East Aurora, New York. It was abandoned and replaced by a new bridge across the river.

References 

Ghost towns in Florida
Geography of Suwannee County, Florida
1861 establishments in Florida